Thorga is a village in Gulmi district, Lumbini Zone, Nepal.
It is mostly inhabited by Brahmins. The population of this village is around 1200 and literacy rate is about 35%.

Gulmi District
Gulmi District, a part of Lumbini Zone, is one of the seventy-five districts of Nepal. The district, with Tamghas as its headquarters, covers an area of 1,149 km², had a population of 296,654 in 2001 and 280,160 in 2011.

Main features

It is renowned for coffee farming. People here depend upon agriculture and teaching occupation. In Agriculture, coffee & sugarcane are the main products.

Education institutes
 Shree Prativa Primary school
 Rainbow Boarding School
 Shree Rastriya Higher secondary school

See also
Lumbini zone

References

Populated places in Gulmi District